Microprofessor II (MPF II), introduced in 1982, was Multitech's (later renamed Acer) second branded computer product and also one of the earliest Apple II clones. It does not look like most other computers. The case of the MPF II was a slab with a small chiclet keyboard on its lower part.

In 1983, the Multiprofessor II retailed in the UK for £269.00 including VAT.

One key feature of the MPF II was its Chinese BASIC, a version of Chinese-localized BASIC based on Applesoft BASIC.
There was also a version sold in Europe, Northern America, India, Singapore, and Australia that did not have Chinese localization.

Differences to Apple II

The MPF II was not totally compatible with the Apple II.

The MPF II did not have Apple II's text mode. All the text was drawn on the screen by software rather than generated by hardware. It was the only cost-effective way to generate Chinese text on the screen at a time when a hardware-based Chinese character generator could cost hundreds of U.S. dollars.

Like Apple II, MPF II had two graphics buffers. However, the second buffer was at address A000H while with Apple II it was at 4000H. The keyboard input was mapped to a different address than the Apple II making impossible to play Apple's games on the MPF II.

MPF-II keyboard interface was very simple and consisted of an 8-bit output port and an input port that was directly connected to the keyboard matrix. The Apple joystick interface was not there, and instead, the joystick appeared as a keyboard with arrow keys and two other buttons.

The external slot interface was also not compatible with the Apple II and could not use any standard interface cards including the Disk II controller.

Technical information

CPU: MOS Technology 6502
Clock rate: 1 MHz
RAM: 64 KB (including 16KB RAM mapped at the same address as the ROM)
ROM: 16 KB (12 KB of which is a BASIC interpreter)
Text modes: 40×24 (using graphics mode)
Graphics modes: 280×192
Colours: 8 colours
Sound: 1 channel of 1-bit sound
Connectors: Keyboard, Printer, Expansion port, cassette recorded input and output, Composite and TV-out
Optional peripherals: 55 key full-size keyboard, Floppy disc drive, Thermal and Dot-matrix printers, Joystick
Power supply: External PSU, 5,12V

See also 
 Microprofessor I — unrelated Z80 programming education device
 Microprofessor III

External links 
 MPF II at the Old Computer Museum

Acer Inc. computers
Early microcomputers
Home computers
Apple II clones